Miriam O'Callaghan may refer to:

 Miriam O'Callaghan, Irish television presenter
 Miriam O'Callaghan (camogie), President of the Camogie Association